The International Institute of Sociology (IIS) is a scholarly organization which seeks to stimulate and facilitate the development, exchange, and application of scientific knowledge to questions of sociological relevance. Membership is open to all sociologists as well as to scholars in neighbouring disciplines.

Created in Paris in 1893 by René Worms, it is the oldest continuous sociological association in existence. Its first congress was held in Paris in October 1894 under the chairmanship of René Worms, which formalised the foundation of this institution. The Révue internationale de sociologie, founded the year before, became the printed organ of the Institute. Since its foundation the goal of the IIS has been to bring together sociologists from around the world. It has a longstanding tradition of promoting discussions on the most crucial theoretical issues of the day and on the practical use of social scientific knowledge. Among its members and associates were prominent scholars such as: Franz Boas, Roger Bastide, Lujo Brentano, Theodor Geiger, Gustave Le Bon, Karl Mannheim, William F. Ogburn, Pitirim Sorokin, Georg Simmel, Werner Sombart, Gabriel Tarde, Ferdinand Toennies, Thorstein Veblen, Lester F. Ward, Eliezer Ben-Rafael, Sidney Webb, Max Weber, Florian Znaniecki, and Ludwig Gumplowicz

Every two years the IIS organizes a world congress in Sociology. Recent IIS World Congresses were held in Yerevan (2009), Budapest (2008), Stockholm (2005), Beijing (2004), Kraków (2001), Tel Aviv (1999), Köln (1997), Trieste (1995), Paris (1993), Kobe (1991), and Rome (1989).

In addition to the congresses and other meetings, the IIS publishes the Annales de l'Institut International de Sociologie / Annals of the International Institute of Sociology. First published in 1895 after the first world congress, this book series seeks to present cutting-edge research and synthesis.

See also
International Sociological Association

References

 A detailed history of the IIS

Sociological organizations
Organizations established in 1893
Organizations based in Paris